In mathematics, a Poisson superalgebra is a Z2-graded generalization of a Poisson algebra. Specifically, a Poisson superalgebra is an (associative) superalgebra A with a Lie superbracket

such that (A, [·,·]) is a Lie superalgebra and the operator

is a superderivation of A:

A supercommutative Poisson algebra is one for which the (associative) product is supercommutative.

This is one possible way of "super"izing the Poisson algebra. This gives the classical dynamics of fermion fields and classical spin-1/2 particles. The other is to define an antibracket algebra instead. This is used in the BRST and Batalin-Vilkovisky formalism.

Examples 

 If A is any associative Z2 graded algebra, then, defining a new product [.,.] (which is called the super-commutator) by [x,y]:=xy-(-1)|x||y|yx for any pure graded x, y turns A into a Poisson superalgebra.

See also

Poisson supermanifold

References

Super linear algebra
Symplectic geometry